The Americas Zone was one of the three zones of the regional Davis Cup competition in 2017.

In the Americas Zone there were three different tiers, called groups, in which teams competed against each other to advance to the upper tier. Winners in Group I advanced to the World Group Play-offs, along with losing teams from the World Group first round. Teams who lost their respective ties competed in the relegation play-offs, with winning teams remaining in Group I, whereas teams who lost their play-offs were relegated to the Americas Zone Group II in 2018.

Participating nations

Seeds: 
All seeds received a bye into the second round.

Remaining nations:

Draw

 relegated to Group II in 2018.
 and  advance to World Group Play-off.

First round

Ecuador vs. Peru

Dominican Republic vs. Chile

Second round

Ecuador vs. Brazil

Colombia vs. Chile

2nd round play-offs

Dominican Republic vs. Peru

References

External links
Official Website

Americas Zone Group I
Davis Cup Americas Zone